Ubalanka is one of the villages in Ravulapalem Mandal in Konaseema district in Andhra Pradesh State.

References 

Villages in Ravulapalem mandal